Homelix cribratipennis is a species of beetle in the family Cerambycidae. It was described by James Thomson in 1858. It is known from Tanzania, South Africa, Burundi, Cameroon, Rwanda, the Democratic Republic of the Congo, Gabon, the Ivory Coast, Angola, Malawi, Nigeria, the Republic of the Congo, Sierra Leone, Togo, the Central African Republic, Uganda, Ghana, and Zimbabwe.

References

Phrynetini
Beetles described in 1858